John Henry Bernard, PC (27 July 1860 – 29 August 1927), was an Irish Anglican clergyman.

Biography
Bernard was born in Raniganj, India. He was a scholar in Trinity College Dublin in 1879, graduated with a BA in mathematics in 1880. He was elected a Fellow there in 1884, and was later a member of the council of the university, where he held the office of King's Lecturer of Divinity from 1888 to 1902.

He was appointed treasurer of St Patrick's Cathedral, Dublin, by the Dean Henry Jellett in 1897. On Jellett's death, in December 1901, Bernard became a favorite to succeed him as Dean, a position to which he was elected by the chapter of the cathedral 6 February 1902. He served as such until 1911, when he was appointed Bishop of Ossory, Ferns and Leighlin. In 1915 he was appointed Church of Ireland Archbishop of Dublin, serving until 1919.

A prolific scholar, in many fields, including Church history, theology and philosophy, he was the president of the Royal Irish Academy from 1916 to 1921 and Provost of Trinity College Dublin from 1919 to 1927. He was a member of the Board of National Education in Ireland, in which capacity he served as examiner of mathematics in the 1880s.  He was regarded as an unrepentant Unionist, representing their interests as a delegate to the 1917–18 Irish Convention.

Bernard married his cousin Maude Nannie Bernard in 1885; they had two sons and two daughters (Parker (2005): 73).
In April 1915 his son, Lieutenant Robert Bernard of the 1st Battalion of the Royal Dublin Fusiliers was killed in action during the Gallipoli Campaign. He is commemorated at V Beach Cemetery by the Commonwealth War Graves Commission.

Selected works

Books

Edited by

References

Bibliography

External links
 http://anglicanhistory.org/ireland/lindsay5.html Some Archbishops of Dublin (T. S. Lindsay – Dublin, 1928)
 The New Schaff-Herzog Encyclopedia of Religious Knowledge Vol. II (original publication 1908 – circa 1914) "Bernard, John Henry"
 Grace & Favour: A handbook of who lived where in Hampton Court Palace 1750 to 1950

1860 births
1927 deaths
Academics of Trinity College Dublin
Alumni of Trinity College Dublin
Anglican archbishops of Dublin
Anglican biblical scholars
Bishops of Ossory, Ferns and Leighlin
Deans of St. Patrick's Cathedral, Dublin
Fellows of Trinity College Dublin
Irish biblical scholars
Kantian philosophers
Members of the Privy Council of Ireland
Presidents of the Royal Irish Academy
New Testament scholars
Provosts of Trinity College Dublin
Scholars of Trinity College Dublin